Dizzy in Greece is an album by trumpeter Dizzy Gillespie, recorded in 1956 and 1957 and released on the Verve label. The album was reissued as part of the 2CD compilation Birks Works: The Verve Big Band Sessions.

Reception
The AllMusic review awarded the album 4.5 stars.

Track listing
Side One:
 "Hey Pete" (Dizzy Gillespie, Buster Harding, Lester Peterson) - 5:39     
 "Yesterdays" (Otto Harbach, Jerome Kern) - 3:46
 "Tin Tin Deo" (Gil Fuller, Gillespie, Chano Pozo) - 4:17 
 "Groovin' for Nat" (Ernie Wilkins) - 3:21
 "Annie's Dance" (Melba Liston) - 4:05
Side Two:  
 "Cool Breeze" (Tadd Dameron, Billy Eckstine, Gillespie) - 4:55 
 "School Days" (Will D. Cobb, Gus Edwards) - 4:23
 "That's All" (Pete Anson, composer and arranger) - 3:13
 "Stablemates" (Benny Golson) - 4:12
 "Groovin' High" (Gillespie) - 3:53
Recorded in New York City on May 18 or 19 (Side One, track 1), June 6, 1956 (Side One, tracks 2-5 and Side Two, tracks 1 & 2) and April 7 & 8, 1957 (Side Two, tracks 3-5)

Personnel
Dizzy Gillespie - trumpet
Talib Daawud (Side Two, tracks 3-5), Joe Gordon (Side One and Side Two, tracks 1 & 2), Quincy Jones (Side One and Side Two, tracks 1 & 2), Lee Morgan (Side Two, tracks 3-5), Ermit V. Perry, Carl Warwick - trumpet
Al Grey (Side Two, tracks 3-5), Rod Levitt, Melba Liston, Frank Rehak (Side One and Side Two, tracks 1 & 2) - trombone
Ernie Henry (Side Two, tracks 3-5), Jimmy Powell, Phil Woods (Side One and Side Two, tracks 1 & 2) - alto saxophone
Benny Golson (Side Two, tracks 3-5), Billy Mitchell, Ernie Wilkins (Side One and Side Two, tracks 1 & 2) - tenor saxophone
Billy Root (Side Two, tracks 3-5), Marty Flax (Side One and Side Two, tracks 1 & 2) - baritone saxophone
Wynton Kelly (Side Two, tracks 3-5), Walter Davis Jr. (Side One and Side Two, tracks 1 & 2) - piano
Nelson Boyd (Side One and Side Two, tracks 1 & 2), Paul West (Side Two, tracks 3-5) - bass
Charlie Persip - drums

References 

Dizzy Gillespie albums
1957 albums
Verve Records albums
Albums produced by Norman Granz